Mairead, also spelt Maighread, is a feminine given name, the Scottish Gaelic equivalent of Margaret. The Irish Gaelic form is spelt  Máiréad or Mairéad, or Máighréad. Maisie is the pet form of Mairead.

Margaret is derived via French and Latin from  meaning "pearl". The Greek is borrowed from Indo-Iranian languages (Persian).

Notable people with the name include:

Mairead Buicke (born 1981), Irish operatic soprano also active in concert and recital work
Mairéad Byrne (born 1957), Irish poet
Máiréad Carlin (born 1988), Irish singer
Mairead Curran (born 1968), Australian-born children's entertainer, actress and voiceover artist
Mairéad Farrell (1957–1988), Irish volunteer of the Provisional Irish Republican Army (IRA)
Mairéad Farrell, Irish Sinn Féin politician 
Mairéad Graham, camogie player, winner of a Soaring Star award in 2010 and All Ireland Intermediate championship medals in 2001, 2003 and 2011
Mairead inghean Eachainn, spouse of Alexander Stewart, 1st Earl of Buchan and mother of Alexander Stewart, Earl of Mar
Mairead Maguire (born 1944), Irish peace activist, Nobel Peace Prize laureate
Mairéad McAtamney (born 1944), retired Irish sportsperson
Mairead McGuinness (born 1959), Irish EU Commissioner
Mairead McKinley, award-winning Irish actress
Mairead Nash of Queens of Noize, English indie/disco or Wonky pop DJ duo based in London
Mairead Ni Dhomhnaill or Maighread Ní Dhomhnaill (born 1955), Irish traditional singer from Kells, County Meath
Máiréad Ní Ghráda (1896–1971), Irish poet, playwright, and broadcaster born in Kilmaley, County Clare
Mairéad Ní Mhaonaigh (born 1962), Irish fiddler and the lead vocalist for the Irish traditional band Altan
Máiréad Nesbitt (born 1979), classical and Celtic music performer, most notably as a violinist
Mairead Ronan (nee Farrell, Irish radio presenter and television personality

See also
Máire, the Irish language form of Mary/Maria
Mariota, Countess of Ross

References 

Given names derived from gemstones
Irish feminine given names
Irish-language feminine given names